Magdaleno Orbos: Sa Kuko ng Mga Lawin is a 1992 Filipino action film directed by Jose Balagtas. The film stars Eddie Garcia as the titular character, alongside Eddie Gutierrez, Charlie Davao, Star Querubin, Sheila Ysrael, Ilonah Jean, Nick Romano, Dick Israel, Gabriel Romulo, and Jessie Delgado. Produced by Harvest International Films Corporation, the film was released on September 3, 1992.

Critic Justino Dormiendo of the Manila Standard gave Magdaleno Orbos a negative review, criticizing the film's direction, acting, and routine plot.

Plot
Magdaleno Orbos, a wealthy contractor in the construction industry, is honest and fair in doing his job. Fellow businessman Mr. Alingcastre resents this fact, and begins to harass Magdaleno and send him threats of violence. Because Magdaleno is unfazed by his threats, Alingcastre sends assassins to kill his workers instead. Eventually, Magdaleno's wife is killed by the men of Alingcastre, leading to Magdaleno becoming a vigilante.

Cast

Eddie Garcia as Magdaleno Orbos
Eddie Gutierrez as Mr. Alingcastre
Charlie Davao as Araneta
Star Querubin
Sheila Ysrael
Ilonah Jean
Nick Romano
Dick Israel as Jake
Gabriel Romulo
Jessie Delgado
Philip Gamboa
Orestes Ojeda
Renato del Prado
Conrad Poe
Tsing Tong Tsai
Chanel Cuenca
Jennifer Nubla
Shana Torres
Susan Tolentino
Robin Shou
Chun Hua Li (as Kingkong)
Edgar Tejada
Odette Khan
Usman Hassim
Bobby Benitez
Eddie del Mar Jr.
Rommel Valdez
Danny Riel
Robert Talby
Robert Miller
Alex David
Joe Baltazar
Bebeng Amora
Vic Felipe
Ros Olgado
Naty Santiago

Production
Shooting for Magdaleno Orbos lasted for nearly a year, and began before Eddie Garcia was even cast in the lead role. Hong Kong actors Robin Shou and Chun Hua Li, the latter credited as Kingkong, were also cast in the film.

It is actress and Manila councilor Star Querubin's final film before she retired from show business to focus on her education.

Release
Magdaleno Orbos premiered at SM Megamall in Mandaluyong on August 30, 1992, before being released nationwide on September 3.

Critical response
Justino Dormiendo, writing for the Manila Standard, gave the film a negative review, criticizing the film's "tired plot" involving vigilantes, implausible scenarios, direction, and acting.

References

External links

1992 films
1992 action films
Filipino-language films
Films about businesspeople
Films set in Manila
Films shot in Manila
Philippine action films
Philippine vigilante films
Harvest International Films films
Films directed by Jose Balagtas